Software bundle may refer to:

 Pre-installed software
 Bundled software
 Software suite